Melek Bilge (born March 23, 1989 in Istanbul, Turkey) is a Turkish professional basketball player. Melek's parents are Bosniak immigrants from Serbia. She has both Turkish and Serbian citizenship. She currently plays for Bodrum Belediyesi in Second League of Turkey at position center.

Career
On 21 July 2010, Galatasaray Medical Park announced that Melek had joined the team on a five-year contract.

Awards and achievements
Turkish Cup Finalist -2006
Turkish U18 National Team -2006-2007
Turkish National Team -2008
Turkish U20 National Team -2008
European Championships U20 in Chieti (ITA) -2008
Qualifications to European Championships 2009: 5 games: 2.4ppg, 1.4rpg
European Championships in Latvia -2009: 3 games: 0.7ppg

References

External links
Profile at eurobasket.com
Statistics at Turkish Basketball Federation

1989 births
Living people
Basketball players from Istanbul
Centers (basketball)
Turkish women's basketball players
Migrosspor basketball players
Beşiktaş women's basketball players
Galatasaray S.K. (women's basketball) players
Turkish people of Bosniak descent